Robert C. Underwood (October 27, 1915 – March 30, 1988) was an American jurist.

Born in Gardner, Illinois, Underwood received his bachelor's degree from Illinois Wesleyan University in 1937 and his bachelor's degree from University of Illinois College of Law in 1939. Underwood practiced law in Normal, Illinois. Underwood served as Normal City Attorney and as circuit court judge for McLean County, Illinois. He also served as an assistant state's attorney for McLean County. Underwood was a Republican. Underwood served on the Illinois Supreme Court from 1962 until his retirement in 1984. He served as chief justice from 1969 until 1976, longer than any other jurist. Underwood died of a heart attack at his home in Normal, Illinois.

Notes

1915 births
1988 deaths
People from Gardner, Illinois
People from Normal, Illinois
Illinois Wesleyan University alumni
University of Illinois College of Law alumni
Illinois Republicans
Illinois state court judges
Chief Justices of the Illinois Supreme Court
20th-century American judges
Justices of the Illinois Supreme Court